Trixie is a generally derogatory slang term referring to a young urban white woman, typically single and in her 20s or early 30s.  The term originated during the 1990s in Chicago, Illinois, with a popular satirical website dedicated to the Lincoln Park Trixie Society, a fictional social club based in Chicago's upscale Lincoln Park neighborhood.

Concept 
Trixies are  described as "social climbing, marriage-minded, money-hungry young ladies that seem to flock to the upwardly-mobile neighborhood of Lincoln Park." Another description states that "every town has its Trixies. They're the women with Kate Spade bags for every day of the week; the ex-sorority girls still lusting after big, dumb jocks; the women who go to law school to find husbands." The stereotypical counterparts of Trixies, and the men they usually end up marrying, are referred to in slang as Chads.

Shane DuBow of National Geographic, reporting about the Lincoln Park Trixie Society website, wrote that the Trixie stereotype describes a "blond, late-twenties woman with a ponytail who works in PR or marketing, drives a black Jetta, gets manicures and no-foam skim lattes", noticing that the website looked like a straight-faced parody.

The term Trixie was used by some Chicago businesses: a salad being named the "Trixie Salad" at a Chicago restaurant, and a hair salon named the Trixie Girl Blow Dry Bar.

See also

 Airhead (subculture)
 Becky (slang)
 Bimbo
 Chad (slang)
 Chav
 Dumb blonde
 Essex girl
 Ganguro
 Karen (slang)
 Kogal
 Pixie
 Paninaro
 Sloane Ranger
 Trixie Mattel
 Valley girl
 Yuppie

References

External links
 About Trixie (from the Lincoln Park Chad website)
 Lincoln Park Trixie Society Website (archived version)
 Lincoln Park Trixie Society Official Website (Currently inactive)
 Lincoln Park Chad Society Website
 Review of LPTs on Flakmag.com

Class-related slurs
Culture of Chicago
European-American culture in Chicago
Pejorative terms for white women
Social class in the United States
Social class subcultures
Social groups
Stereotypes of middle class women
Stereotypes of upper class women
Stereotypes of urban people
Stereotypes of white Americans
White American culture in Chicago
Women in the United States
1990s neologisms
Socioeconomic stereotypes